New Girl is an American sitcom.

New Girl or The New Girl may also refer to:

Television
"New Girl" (The Office), an episode of the UK television series The Office
"The New Girl" (Haven), an episode of the Syfy series Haven
 "The New Girl" (Mad Men), and episode of the AMC series Mad Men

Music
"New Girl", a song from The Suicide Machines' 1995 album, Destruction by Definition
"New Girl", a New Boyz song from their 2009 album Skinny Jeanz and a Mic
"New Girl", a 3OH!3 song from their 2013 album Omens
"New Girl" (song), a Reggie 'N' Bollie song

Other
The New Girl (novel), a 1989 novel by R. L. Stine

See also
"New Girl Now", a 1984 song by the Canadian rock band Honeymoon Suite
 New Girl, Old Story, a 1991 album by Tony Lombardo and All
 "New Age Girl", a 1994 song by Deadeye Dick
 New Girl in Town (disambiguation)
 Brave New Girl (disambiguation)